Delancey Street Preview Center is an attraction located at Universal Studios Florida. It is seasonal, and is an interactive attraction allowing park guests to preview an upcoming Universal Studios' Film or television show.

The attraction is located in the New York City area of the park, and opened in spring 2006 next to The Blues Brothers Show attraction. It allows visitors to preview an upcoming Universal TV program or film by sitting in front of individual computer monitors equipped with headphones. This allows the Universal company to receive feedback from a wide range of sources. The attraction is seasonal, and only operates during peak seasons much like the Fear Factor Live and Mel's Drive-In Concert attractions. Previously, before the attraction opened, the building was used for storage.

References

Amusement rides introduced in 2006
Universal Studios Florida
Universal Parks & Resorts attractions by name
2006 establishments in Florida